By Chance Upon Waking is the debut album by Nalle. The album was released in 2006 on the Pickled Egg Records label.

Track listing
"Sunne Song" -  (4:46)
"Midwinter's Dream" -  (3:38)
"Iron's Oath" -  (6:14)
"Sea Change" -  (2:34)
"Forest-Mountain" -   (6:25)
"New Roots" -   (4:21)
"Birth of the Bear (Ursa minor)" -   (8:13)
"Ravens" -   (5:19)

Downloadable songs
Sunne Song
Iron's Oath
New Roots

References

External links
Nalle on Myspace
A losingtoday.com article on Nalle and Pickled Egg.

Nalle (band) albums
2006 debut albums